Janko Pacar (born 18 August 1990) is a Swiss football forward who currently plays for FC Emmenbrücke.

Career

In January 2016, he joined Petrolul Ploiești on an 18-month loan deal but the contract expired when the club relegated at the end of the 2015–16 season. In July 2016, he signed a three-year contract with FC Wohlen.

Ahead of the 2019/20 season, Pacar joined FC Emmenbrücke.

References

External links
 

1990 births
Living people
Swiss men's footballers
Swiss expatriate footballers
Swiss Super League players
Swiss Challenge League players
Swiss Promotion League players
FC Luzern players
SC Kriens players
FC Winterthur players
FC Chiasso players
Servette FC players
FC Petrolul Ploiești players
FC Wohlen players
Yverdon-Sport FC players
Expatriate footballers in Romania
Association football forwards
Sportspeople from Lucerne